Stadionul Clujana is a multi-use stadium in Cluj-Napoca. It is currently the home ground of Sănătatea Cluj and Universitatea Cluj youth academy. It currently holds 2,000 people. This was also the home ground of Dermata Cluj, CFR Cluj, and Sănătatea Cluj.

Gallery

References

External links
 Stadionul Clujana at Soccerway

Football venues in Romania
Buildings and structures in Cluj-Napoca
Sports venues in Cluj-Napoca
CFR Cluj
FC Universitatea Cluj